Secret Games is a 1992 American erotic thriller drama film directed by Gregory Dark and produced by Andrew W. Garroni. This film has been music composed by Joseph Smith. The film stars Martin Hewitt, Michele Brin, Delia Sheppard, Catya Sassoon, Sabrina Mesko, Kimberly Williams and Billy Drago in the lead roles.

Cast
 Martin Hewitt as Eric
 Michele Brin as Julianne Langford
 Delia Sheppard as Celeste
 Catya Sassoon as Sandra
 Sabrina Mesko as Pam
 Kimberly Williams as Greta
 Billy Drago as Mark Langford
 Monique Parent as Robin
 Kelly Royce as Katherine
 Gary Kasper as Rafjad
 Christian Bocher as Emil
 Alison Armitage as Nun
 Craig Stepp as Fantasy Man
 Lana Wilson as Bonnie
 John Tripp as Ron
 Paula Brandis as Brunette
 Herbert Feinberg as Detective Rogers
 Herbert Gernert as Detective Brown
 David Van Antwerp as The Waiter
 Darryl A. Imai as Japanese Businessman 1
 Roger Ito as Japanese Businessman 2
 Thomas Sasaki as Japanese Businessman 3
 Peggy Dobreer as Hooker 1
 Dorissa Curry as Hooker 2

References

External links
 
 

1992 films
1990s erotic thriller films
1990s thriller drama films
American erotic thriller films
American thriller drama films
1992 thriller films
1992 drama films
1990s English-language films
1990s American films
Films directed by Gregory Dark